Association de la Jeunesse Auxerroise, commonly known as AJ Auxerre or simply Auxerre, is a French football club based in the commune of Auxerre in Burgundy. The club was founded in 1905 and currently plays in Ligue 1, the first division of French football. Auxerre plays its home matches at the Stade l'Abbé-Deschamps on the banks of the Yonne River. The team is managed by Christophe Pélissier and captained by midfielder Birama Touré.

Auxerre was founded in 1905 and made its debut in the first division of French football in the 1980–81 season and remained a fixture in the league until the 2011–12 season. The club has won the Ligue 1 title once, in the 1995–96 season. Two years prior, Auxerre achieved its first major honour by winning the Coupe de France in 1994. The club has since added three more Coupe de France titles, which ties the club for fifth-best among teams who have won the trophy.

Auxerre has produced several notable players during its existence. The club has most notably served as a springboard for several prominent French football players such as Eric Cantona, Laurent Blanc, Stéphane Guivarc'h, Philippe Mexès, Basile Boli, and Djibril Cissé, among others, who all became French internationals, with Blanc playing on the teams that won the 1998 FIFA World Cup and UEFA Euro 2000. Guivarc'h, Bernard Diomède and Lionel Charbonnier were the three footballers from Auxerre who were world champions in 1998. From 1961 to 2005, the club was predominantly coached by Guy Roux. This included an uninterrupted period when Roux was in charge for 36 years between 1964 and 2000.

History 

The club Association de la Jeunesse Auxerroise was founded in 1905, by the abbot Ernest Abbé Deschamps. The club success, becoming a force in the Catholic league F.G.S.P.F. In 1908, the club even reached the F.G.S.P.F. French Championship final, losing 8–1 however. At the end of the First World War, the club was expelled from its ground. Father Deschamps acquired several pieces of land along the Yonne on the Vaux road, which later formed the Abbé Deschamps Stadium.

Auxerre made its first steps in Division 1 on 24 July 1980 against Bastia in Toulon. Auxerre lost the match 2–0. On 20 November 1980, Andrzej Szarmach signed for Auxerre having received consent from the Polish Football Association. He started two days later at home against Lyon and scored the first of his ninety-four goals in Division 1. AJA's first season in Division 1 was remarkable for two particular performances: on 13 December 1980, at Parc des Princes against Paris Saint-Germain (3–2), and then on 7 April 1981, at Stade Marcel Saupin against Nantes for a 1–0 win, notable as Nantes had not lost a home game for five years and 92 games (between 15 April 1976 and 7 April 1981). In the next two seasons, AJA finished fifteenth and eighth respectively.

During the 1983–84 season, AJA climbed for the first time onto the podium in finishing third. Patrice Garande finished top scorer with twenty-one goals. A few weeks later, Garande won the gold medal at the Olympics in Los Angeles with the French Olympic football team while Joël Bats and Jean-Marc Ferreri were part of the victorious French team at UEFA Euro 1984. That summer, Auxerre recruited Michel N'Gom. An international prospect, he left Paris Saint-Germain. During pre-season, he scored five goals in ten games. On the last weekend before the start of the season, he visited his former teammates in Paris. He died following a traffic accident on 12 August 1984. To pay tribute, one of the stands at Abbé Deschamps bears his name. The 1984–1985 season saw Auxerre in European competition for the first time in its history by participating in the UEFA Cup, albeit with an unfavourable first round draw with Sporting Clube de Portugal. On 19 September 1984 at Estádio José Alvalade, AJA took its bow in European football with a 2–0 defeat. The return leg took place on 3 October 1984. AJA managed to retrieve the two goal deficit with a double by Szarmach, but eventually succumbed with two goals in extra time. However, by virtue of the victory of Monaco in the Coupe de France, AJA also qualified for the UEFA Cup the year after.

The 1985 offseason saw Joël Bats join Paris Saint-Germain. Auxerre recruited Bruno Martini as his successor. In the UEFA Cup, AJA were drawn against Milan. In the first leg, Auxerre won 3–1. Both teams missed a penalty and Paolo Maldini made his debut in European competition. In the return match, AJA lost 3–0 and was therefore eliminated. Seventh in the league and quarter-finalist in the French cup, AJA did not manage a third straight season in Europe. Auxerre finished fourth in 1986–1987, and was once again eliminated in the first round of the UEFA Cup the following season with a 2–0 away defeat to Panathinaikos too much to overcome in the return leg (which Auxerre won 3–2). The 1988–89 season saw AJA finish fifth in the league and reach the semi-finals of the Coupe de France before elimination by Olympique de Marseille, the future winner of the event. With fifth place in the league, AJA made the UEFA Cup and there made its first decent run. During the preliminary round, AJA managed its first victory. Beaten 0–1 at home by Dinamo Zagreb, it registered 3–1 in Yugoslavia and qualified for the first round proper. Auxerre beat successively Albanians Apolonia Fier, Finns RoPS and Olympiacos of Greece before being eliminated in the quarterfinals by Fiorentina. In parallel with this, AJA managed sixth place in the league. During the summer of 1990, the AJA sold Basile Boli and recruited Enzo Scifo, Alain Roche and Zbigniew Kaczmarek. Auxerre finished in third place after leading the championship for two weeks.

In 1991–92, Auxerre was eliminated in the second round of the UEFA Cup by Liverpool and then finished fourth in Division 1. That summer, the AJA sold Alain Roche and Jean-Marc Ferreri while recruiting Frank Verlaat and Gerald Baticle. Auxerre then journeyed again into UEFA. Auxerre eliminated Lokomotiv Plovdiv and the newly formed F.C. Copenhagen. In the third round, AJA eliminated Standard Liège. In the quarterfinals, AJA faced Ajax, the defending champion and undefeated in the European Cup for two years. Before facing Ajax, Auxerre had suffered five consecutive league defeats. Auxerre managed a 4–2 home win. In the second leg Ajax could only manage a 1–0 win and so Auxerre had qualified for the semifinals, to face Borussia Dortmund. In the first leg in Germany, AJA lost 2–0. A fiercely contested second leg levelled the aggregate score, but Auxerre were finally eliminated on penalties.

While finishing sixth in the championship, Auxerre again qualified for the UEFA Cup after the VA-OM case. But unlike the epic run of the previous season, AJA was eliminated in the first round by Tenerife. AJA made progress in the league, with a third-place finish, but notably captured its first major trophy, the French cup. Having made it past the lower division teams in the early rounds, AJA eliminated Nantes in the semifinals before winning 3 goals to 0 at Parc des Princes in the final against Montpellier. The following season, Auxerre finished fourth in the league and was a quarter-finalist of the Cup Winners' Cup: Auxerre was eliminated by Arsenal in the Abbe-Deschamps (1–0) having achieved a 1–1 draw at Highbury.

During the 1995–96 season, the club won Division 1 for the first time in their history, and also won the Coupe de France.

On 13 May 2012, Auxerre's 32-year stay in the top division came to an end after a 3–0 away defeat at the hands of Marseille. The following season, Auxerre finished a disappointing ninth place along with a goal difference of −2. The next season was no better for AJA, after they finished a lowly 16th position. Although not resulting in promotion the 2014–15 Ligue 2 season was better for the Burgundy based side as they finished ninth in Ligue 2 and finishing runners-up in the 2015 Coupe de France Final after losing to Paris Saint-Germain at the Stade de France in front of an attendance of 80,000. The 2018–19 season was Auxerre's seventh consecutive in the Ligue 2. In the 2020–21 Ligue 2 season, the Auxerrois would achieve their best finish in the second tier since their relegation with a 6th-place finish, although they were positioned within the top 5 required for at least the playoffs at the end of 17 of the 38 game weeks. In the 2021–22 Ligue 2 season, AJA were finally promoted back to Ligue 1 after 10 years, after a penalty shoot-out win against Saint-Etienne in the Ligue1 promotion/relegation play-offs.

Players

Current squad

Out on loan

Notable players 

Below is the starting 11 of historic football players who have played at Auxerre in league and international competition since the club's foundation in 1905 as voted by the club's supporters.
Khalilou Fadiga
Bruno Martini
Basile Boli
Philippe Mexès
Bacary Sagna
Enzo Scifo
Jean-Alain Boumsong
Abou Diaby
Yann Lachuer
Djibril Cissé
Eric Cantona
Andrzej Szarmach
Fabien Cool
Yaya Sanogo

Management 
Owner: James Zhou
President: Yunjie Zhou
Director of Youth: Frédéric Zago
Director of Football: Cédric Daury
Manager:  Christophe Pélissier
Assistant manager: Michel Padovani
Goalkeeper coach: Attila Farkas
Fitness coach: Thomas Joubert, Robert Duverne
Video analyst: Emmanuel Pascal
Scout: Alain Pascalou, Abdel Chouache
Physiotherapist: Rudy Slepko
Team Organiser: Christophe Grosso

Coaching history

Honours

Domestic

League
Ligue 1
Champions: 1995–96
Ligue 2
Winners: 1979–80
Division d'Honneur (Burgundy)
Winners: 1970
FGSPF Championnat
Runners-up: 1909
FGSPF Burgundy Championnat
Champions (9): 1906, 1907, 1908, 1909, 1910, 1911, 1912, 1913, 1914

Cups
Coupe de France
Winners (4): 1993–94, 1995–96, 2002–03, 2004–05
Runners-up (2): 1978–79, 2014–15

International 
UEFA Intertoto Cup
Winners (2): 1997, 2006 (joint winner)
Runners-up: 2000
Coppa delle Alpi
Champions (2): 1985, 1987

Statistics

Latest seasons
{|class="wikitable"
|-bgcolor="#efefef"
! Season
!
! Pos.
!Cup
!League Cup
!colspan=2|Europe
!Other Comp.
!Notes
|-
|1990–91
|1D
|align=center bgcolor=#CC9966 | 3rd
|
|
|
|
|-
|1991–92
|1D
|align=center | 4th
|
|
||UC|||2nd round
|
|
|-
|1992–93
|1D
|align=center | 6th
|
|
||UC|||Semi-final
|
|
|-
|1993–94
|1D
|align=center bgcolor=#CC9966| 3rd
|bgcolor=gold|Winner
|
||UC|||2nd round
|
|
|-
|1994–95
|1D
|align=center |4th
|
|Last 16
|
|
|
|-
|1995–96
|1D
|align=center bgcolor=gold |1st
|bgcolor=gold|Winner
|Quarter-final
||UC|||2nd round
|
|
|-
|1996–97
|1D
|align=center |6th
|
|Last 16
||UCL|||Quarter-final
|bgcolor=gold|TDC
|
|-
|1997–98
|1D
|align=center |7th
|
|bgcolor=#CC9966|Semi-final
||UC|||Quarter-final
|bgcolor=gold|Intertoto
|
|-
|1998–99
|1D
|align=center |14th
|
|Quarter-final
|
|Intertoto
|
|-
|1999–2000
|1D
|align=center |8th
|
|
|
|
|
|-
|2000–01
|1D
|align=center |13th
|Quarter-final
|Quarter-final
|
|Intertoto
|
|-
|2001–02
|1D
|align=center bgcolor=#CC9966|3rd
|Last 32
|Quarter-final
|
|
|
|-
|2002–03
|1D
|align=center |6th
|bgcolor=gold|Winner
|Last 16
||UCL|||Group stage
|
|
|-
|2003–04
|1D
|align=center |4th
|Quarter-final
|bgcolor=#CC9966 |Semi-final
||UC|||4th round
|bgcolor=silver|TDC
|
|-
|2004–05
|1D
|align=center |8th
|bgcolor=gold |Winner
|Quarter-final
||UC|||Quarter-final
|
|
|-
|2005–06
|1D
|align=center |6th
|
|Quarter-final
||UC|||1st round
|bgcolor=silver|TDC
|
|-
|2006–07
|1D
|align=center |8th
|
|Quarter-final
||UC|||Group stage
|Intertoto
|
|-
|2007–08
|1D
|align=center |15th
|Last 16
|bgcolor=#CC9966 |Semi-final
|
|
|
|-
|2008–09
|1D
|align=center |8th
|Last 32
|Quarter-final
|
|
|
|-
|2009–10
|1D
|align=center bgcolor=#CC9966|3rd
|Quarter-final
|Quarter-final
|
|
|
|-
|2010–11
|1D
|align=center |9th
|Last 32
|bgcolor=#CC9966|Semi-final
||UCL|||Group stage
|
|
|-
|2011–12
|1D
|align=center bgcolor=FFCCC |20th
|Last 16
|bgcolor=#CC9966|Semi-final
|
|
|
|-
|2012–13
|2D
|align=center |9th
|7th round
|Quarter-final
|
|
|
|-
|2013–14
|2D
|align=center |16th
|Quarter-final
|Quarter-final
|
|
|
|-
|2014–15
|2D
|align=center |9th
|bgcolor=silver | Runner-up
|3rd round
|
|
|
|-
|2015–16
|2D
|align=center |8th
|
|Last 16
|
|
|
|-
|2016–17
|2D
|align=center |17th
|Quarter-final
|Last 16
|
|
|
|-
|2017–18
|2D
|align=center |11th
|Quarter-final
|1st round
|
|
|
|-
|2018–19
|2D
|align=center |15th
|Last 16
|1st round
|
|
|
|-
|2019–20
|2D
|align=center |11th
|8th round
|1st round
|
|
|
|-
|-
|2020–21
|2D
|align=center |6th
|Last 32
|discontinued
|
|
|
|-
|2021–22
|2D
|align=center bgcolor=#CC9966|3rd
|Last 32
|
|
|
|
|-
|2022–23
|1D
|align=center |ongoing
|ongoing
|
|
|
|
|-
|}

Color:

References

External links 

 
Association football clubs established in 1905
1905 establishments in France
Sport in Yonne
A
Football clubs in Bourgogne-Franche-Comté
Ligue 1 clubs